Tilia caroliniana Mill. is a species of tree in the family Malvaceae native to the southern and south-eastern states of the U.S., and Mexico.

Taxonomy
T. caroliniana consists of 4 subspecies:
 T. caroliniana subsp. caroliniana
 T. caroliniana subsp. floridana Small (E. Murray)
 T. caroliniana subsp. heterophylla (Vent.) Pigott)
 T. caroliniana subsp. occidentalis (Rose) Pigott)
Trees described as belonging to Tilia mexicana, belong to either subsp. floridana or subsp. occidentalis. However, the taxonomy of American species of Tilia remains a matter of contention. DNA analysis, which has clarified much of the taxonomy of genera such as Ulmus, has yet to be applied to Tilia. Pigott (2012) wrote:

The complexity of variation in American Tilia is not readily treated by classical taxonomy, and attempts to do so have resulted in the description of a profusion of species and varieties that are often separated by small and inconsistent differences.

Description 
The flowers, larger than those of T. americana, are produced in clusters of 10–24 together. The fruit is spherical,  diameter, downy, with the fruit bract pointed at the base.

Uses 
The young leaves are edible, and can be made into a mild-flavored tea.

Cultivation 
Seed of Mexican specimens collected by the British 1991 expedition in the Sierra Madre Oriental has yielded trees which are 'growing steadily' in British gardens, including on heavy clay. The species is currently (2017) in commerce in the UK.

Notable trees 
In the UK, the TROBI champion, identified as T. mexicana, grows at Wisley, where it had attained a height of 8 m and a d.b.h. of 17 cm by 2010.

The record-holding tree is located on the campus of Radford University in Virginia.

References 

https://www.roanoke.com/news/education/higher_education/radford/record-setting-tree-calls-radford-university-campus-home/article_24672236-abdf-5136-8e3e-703b04edee9d.html

Flora of the Appalachian Mountains
Trees of the Eastern United States
Trees of the Northeastern United States
Trees of the Southeastern United States
Flora of Virginia
Trees of Mexico
Plants described in 1768
Taxa named by Philip Miller
Flora of the Sierra Madre Occidental
Flora without expected TNC conservation status
Flora of the Sierra Madre Oriental